Lam Kui-chun, JP (born 20 November 1941, Macau) is a member of the Liberal Party and was the unofficial member of the Legislative Council of Hong Kong (1991—95).

References

1941 births
Living people
Liberal Party (Hong Kong) politicians
HK LegCo Members 1991–1995